Piet Allegaert (born 20 January 1995) is a Belgian cyclist, who currently rides for UCI WorldTeam .

Career
Born in Moorslede, Allegaert signed with UCI Professional Continental team  in 2017, after riding with UCI WorldTeam  as a stagiaire the previous season. He finished in 17th place in Paris–Roubaix, his debut classic. That year, he also won the combativity classification in the BinckBank Tour.

Major results
2016
 7th Paris–Roubaix Espoirs
2017
 1st  Combativity classification, BinckBank Tour
 1st  Mountains classification, Three Days of De Panne
2019
 1st Tour de l'Eurométropole
 8th Münsterland Giro
 8th Halle–Ingooigem
 10th Gooikse Pijl
2020
 5th Grand Prix d'Isbergues
2021
 2nd Tro-Bro Léon
 4th Paris–Bourges
 5th Dwars door het Hageland
 9th Grand Prix de Denain
2022
 3rd Cholet-Pays de la Loire
 4th Gooikse Pijl
 5th Grote Prijs Marcel Kint
 6th Memorial Rik Van Steenbergen
 7th Trofeo Alcúdia – Port d'Alcúdia
 7th Heistse Pijl
 7th Ronde van Limburg
 8th Dwars door het Hageland
 9th Eschborn–Frankfurt
 10th Egmont Cycling Race

Grand Tour general classification results timeline

References

External links

1995 births
Living people
Belgian male cyclists
People from Moorslede
Cyclists from West Flanders
21st-century Belgian people